Saška Karan (born Savka Gazivoda, 6 March 1964) is a Serbian singer and reality television participant.

She released five albums at the beginning of the 1990s, and after a 6 years hiatus, another 2 albums in the 2000s.

In the 2010s, she took part in the reality TV shows Farma (2013), Zadruga (2017) and Parovi (2015) on Serbian TV.

Studio albums 

 1990: Osmeh zavarava
 1991: Srce puno baruta
 1993: Koliko mi se sviđaš, već mi se priviđaš
 1994: Jedan i jedan su tri
 1995: Obožavam žestoke mladiće
 2001: Ukrštenica
 2005: Lepa kao greh

References 

Reality television participants
20th-century Serbian women singers
1964 births
Living people
21st-century Serbian women singers